The Longest Night in Shanghai is a 2007 film produced by Japan's Movie Eye Entertainment and directed by Chinese director Zhang Yibai. It is a rare collaboration between China and Japan.

The film consists of a diverse cast. It stars Chinese actress Zhao Wei and Japanese actor Masahiro Motoki. Other members of the cast include Taiwanese actor Dylan Kuo, Hong Kong actor Sam Lee, and Japanese actress Naomi Nishida.

Cast
Zhao Wei as Lin Xi
Masahiro Motoki as Naoki Mizushima
Naomi Nishida as Miho Takahashi
Shinobu Otsuka as Rie Hara
Naoto Takenaka as Taro Yamaoka
Takashi Tsukamoto as Ryuichi Kwaguchi
Toshihiro Wada as Atsushi Kayama
Dylan Kuo as Dongdong
Feng Li as Lin Xi's brother
Ben Niu as Old taxi-driver
Zhang Xinyi as Policewoman

Synopsis
Lin Xi's the struggling taxi driver who literally runs Naoki down in the street after he goes on a walkabout. Eager to placate the mysterious foreigner, Lin offers to chauffeur him around town, yet by the time she discovers Naoki has neither money nor any grasp of Chinese, he is captivated by watching her attempt to deal with her own personal problems. She should get him back home, but the phone calls keep coming in. He should get back to his hotel, but the strange bond he is forming with this woman (even though he barely understands a word she's saying) is the first thing in years to have him feeling alive.

Soundtracks
Firefly; Breathe (by Frally Hynes)

Reception
"Pic shuttlecocks between the corny and the involving, but Zhao's natural perf and Shanghai itself (always front and center, knitted into the action) keep things watchable." – Variety

Awards and nominations

References

External links
 

2007 films
2000s Cantonese-language films
2000s Japanese-language films
2000s Mandarin-language films
Films set in Shanghai
Films directed by Zhang Yibai
2007 romantic drama films
Chinese romantic drama films
2000s Japanese films
2007 multilingual films
Japanese multilingual films
Chinese multilingual films